Michael Walters (born 7 January 1991) is an Australian rules footballer who plays for the Fremantle Football Club in the Australian Football League (AFL). Originally playing mainly as a small forward, Walters has recently spent more time in the midfield. In 2019 he was rewarded with his debut selection in the All-Australian team.

Junior career
A highly skilled player who mainly plays as a midfielder or forward, Walters was selected by Fremantle with the 53rd pick in the 2008 AFL Draft. He had made his senior debut for Swan Districts in the West Australian Football League in 2008, playing 2 matches.  Nicknamed Son-son, he lived on the same street in Midvale as his former Swan Districts teammates and fellow 2008 AFL draftees Nic Naitanui and Chris Yarran.  Walters' father Mike played for Central District in the South Australian National Football League.

In 2007 he represented Western Australia at the Under 16 Championships and won the Kevin Sheehan Medal (shared with Tom Scully) as the best player in the championships, after kicking 10 goals in his three games.  He was a member of the 2007-08 AIS/AFL Academy squad and in 2008 represented Western Australia at the 2008 AFL Under 18 Championships and was named in the All-Australian Team.

AFL career
Walters made his AFL debut for Fremantle in Round 11 of the 2009 AFL season at Football Park against Port Adelaide, after Hayden Ballantyne was a late withdrawal due to injury.  He kicked a goal in debut match, minutes before fellow debutant and Swan Districts teammate Clancee Pearce also kicked a goal.

Prior to the start of the 2012 AFL season, Walters was suspended from training with Fremantle and sent back to train and play for Swan Districts due to a poor fitness level and being overweight. He improved his fitness and performed well for Swans, and was accepted back at Fremantle in April. Walters returned to the AFL in July, in round 16 against Melbourne.  He played in every game after returning, kicking 22 goals from 10 games. In late September 2012 Walters was re-signed for a further two years, until the end of the 2014 season.

In 2013 Walters had his best season to date, kicking 46 goals From 21 games, was named in the initial All Australian 40-man squad and won his first Fremantle leading goal-kicker award. 

In 2015, he had another consistent goal-kicking season, which saw him kick 44 goals across 22 games, winning his second Fremantle leading goal-kicker award. 

In the 2017 season, his standout performance came in Round 15, at Domain stadium against St Kilda, where he collected a team-high 32 disposals and kicked 6 goals. He was ruled out for the remainder of the season after injuring his Posterior Cruciate Ligament in his left knee, in Fremantle's loss to Hawthorn in Round 18. Despite being moved into the midfield towards the middle of the season, he finished the season with 22 goals from 17 games. He became a member of Fremantle's leadership group in 2017.

In 2018, especially after the suspension and subsequent injury to Nat Fyfe, Walters spent increasing amounts of time in the midfield, where he finished the season averaging 19.8 disposals per game, his highest average in his career so far. 
He won Fremantle's leading goal-kicker award, his 4th for the club, kicking 22 goals from 18 games.
He was a finalist for Mark of the Year, where he was nominated for his high-flying mark on Jeremy McGovern, against the West Coast Eagles in Round 20.

Walters started 2019 in blazing fashion, averaging career-high figures. In Round 10, he kicked a behind after the siren to give the Dockers a 1-point win over the Brisbane Lions at Optus stadium. The following week in the Round 11 clash with Collingwood at the MCG, Walters kicked a goal with 30 seconds remaining to give the Dockers a 4-point lead which ultimately won them the game. Arguably, his best performance came in Round 13 when Fremantle played Port Adelaide at Optus stadium. He kicked 6.1 and picked up 25 disposals in the 21-point victory, and was awarded the maximum 10 in the AFLCA votes for his performance. Walters received his first All-Australian selection named in the 2019 All-Australian team as a half forward.

The 2022 AFL season saw Walters make his return as a forward after spending time in the midfield in recent seasons. Walters played his 200th game during Fremantle's round 23 clash against GWS, he played a pivotal role kicking three goals in Fremantle's 20 point win. Walters played a crucial role in Fremantle's elimination final victory over the Western Bulldogs at Optus Stadium kicking three goals.

Statistics
 Statistics are correct to the end of 2022 Qualifying Finals

|-
! scope="row" style="text-align:center" | 2009
|style="text-align:center;"|
| 38 || 3 || 2 || 1 || 21 || 11 || 32 || 14 || 5 || 0.7 || 0.3 || 7.0 || 3.7 || 10.7 || 4.7 || 1.7 || 0
|- style="background-color: #EAEAEA"
! scope="row" style="text-align:center" | 2010
|style="text-align:center;"|
| 38 || 5 || 8 || 1 || 52 || 17 || 69 || 15 || 12 || 1.6 || 0.2 || 10.4 || 3.4 || 13.8 || 3.0 || 2.4 || 0
|- 
! scope="row" style="text-align:center" | 2011
|style="text-align:center;"|
| 38 || 3 || 4 || 3 || 19 || 5 || 24 || 3 || 8 || 1.3 || 1.0 || 6.3 || 1.7 || 8.0 || 1.0 || 2.7 || 0
|- style="background-color: #EAEAEA"
! scope="row" style="text-align:center" | 2012
|style="text-align:center;"|
| 38 || 10 || 22 || 11 || 83 || 36 || 119 || 40 || 29 || 2.2 || 1.1 || 8.3 || 3.6 || 11.9 || 4.0 || 2.9 || 0
|- 
! scope="row" style="text-align:center" | 2013
|style="text-align:center;"|
| 10 || 21 || 46 || 23 || 231 || 93 || 324 || 108 || 52 || 2.2 || 1.1 || 11.0 || 4.4 || 15.4 || 5.1 || 2.5 || 6
|- style="background-color: #EAEAEA"
! scope="row" style="text-align:center" | 2014
|style="text-align:center;"|
| 10 || 8 || 15 || 13 || 79 || 28 || 107 || 29 || 20 || 1.9 || 1.6 || 9.9 || 3.5 || 13.4 || 3.6 || 2.5 || 0
|- 
! scope="row" style="text-align:center" | 2015
|style="text-align:center;"|
| 10 || 22 || 44 || 19 || 225 || 107 || 332 || 77 || 54 || 2.0 || 0.9 || 10.2 || 4.9 || 15.1 || 3.5 || 2.4 || 3
|- style="background-color: #EAEAEA"
! scope="row" style="text-align:center" | 2016
|style="text-align:center;"|
| 10 || 22 || 36 || 21 || 244 || 157 || 401 || 91 || 66 || 1.6 || 1.0 || 11.1 || 7.1 || 18.2 || 4.1 || 3.0 || 3
|- 
! scope="row" style="text-align:center" | 2017
|style="text-align:center;"|
| 10 || 17 || 22 || 14 || 197 || 130 || 327 || 74 || 45 || 1.3 || 0.8 || 11.6 || 7.6 || 19.2 || 4.4 || 2.6 || 10
|- style="background-color: #EAEAEA"
! scope="row" style="text-align:center" | 2018
|style="text-align:center;"|
| 10 || 18 || 22 || 14 || 206 || 150 || 356 || 65 || 59 || 1.2 || 0.8 || 11.4 || 8.3 || 19.8 || 3.6 || 3.3 || 8
|- 
! scope="row" style="text-align:center" | 2019
|style="text-align:center;"|
| 10 || 22 || 40 || 17 || 303 || 176 || 479 || 83 || 78 || 1.8 || 0.8 || 13.8 || 8.0 || 21.8 || 3.8 || 3.5 || 11
|- style="background-color: #EAEAEA"
! scope="row" style="text-align:center" | 2020
|style="text-align:center;"|
| 10 || 14 || 15 || 7 || 145 || 102 || 247 || 44 || 40 || 1.1 || 0.5 || 10.4 || 7.3 || 17.6 || 3.1 || 2.9 || 8
|-  
! scope="row" style="text-align:center" | 2021
|style="text-align:center;"|
| 10 || 16 || 14 || 11 || 147 || 76 || 223 || 63 || 33 || 0.9 || 0.7 || 9.2 || 4.8 || 13.9 || 3.9 || 2.1 || 0
|- style="background-color: #EAEAEA"
! scope="row" style="text-align:center" | 2022
|style="text-align:center;"|
| 10 || 20 || 23 || 15 || 164 || 121 || 285 || 79 || 54 || 1.2 || 0.8 || 8.2 || 6.1 || 14.3 || 4.0 || 2.7 || 
|- class="sortbottom"
! colspan=3| Career
! 201
! 313
! 170
! 2116
! 1209
! 3325
! 785
! 555
! 1.6
! 0.9
! 10.5
! 6.0
! 16.5
! 3.9
! 2.8
! 49
|}

Notes

References

External links

WAFL Footy Facts playing statistics

Fremantle Football Club players
Living people
1991 births
Indigenous Australian players of Australian rules football
Swan Districts Football Club players
Australian rules footballers from Western Australia
People educated at Governor Stirling Senior High School
All-Australians (AFL)
Peel Thunder Football Club players